Athens Township is one of the fourteen townships of Athens County, Ohio, United States. The 2010 census found 30,473 people in the township.

Geography
Located in the western part of the county, it borders the following townships:
Dover Township - north
Ames Township - northeast corner
Canaan Township - east
Lodi Township - southeast corner
Alexander Township - south
Lee Township - southwest corner
Waterloo Township - west
York Township - northwest corner

Most of the city of Athens, the county seat of Athens County, is located in central and eastern Athens Township, and the census-designated place of The Plains is located in northern Athens Township.

Name and history
Athens Township was organized in 1805.

Statewide, the only other Athens Township is located in Harrison County.

Government
The township is governed by a three-member board of trustees, who are elected in November of odd-numbered years to a four-year term beginning on the following January 1. Two are elected in the year after the presidential election and one is elected in the year before it. There is also an elected township fiscal officer, who serves a four-year term beginning on April 1 of the year after the election, which is held in November of the year before the presidential election. Vacancies in the fiscal officership or on the board of trustees are filled by the remaining trustees.

References

External links
Township website
County website

Townships in Athens County, Ohio
1805 establishments in Ohio
Townships in Ohio